Ute Kostrzewa (later Meyer, born 27 December 1961) is a German former volleyball player who competed for East Germany in the 1980 Summer Olympics.

She was born in Eilenburg.

In 1980 she was part of the East German team which won the silver medal in the Olympic tournament. She played four matches.

References 

 

1961 births
Living people
People from Eilenburg
People from Bezirk Leipzig
German women's volleyball players
Sportspeople from Saxony
Olympic volleyball players of East Germany
Volleyball players at the 1980 Summer Olympics
Olympic silver medalists for East Germany
Olympic medalists in volleyball
Medalists at the 1980 Summer Olympics
Recipients of the Patriotic Order of Merit in bronze
20th-century German women
21st-century German women